A Select Library of the Nicene and Post-Nicene Fathers of the Christian Church, usually known as the Nicene and Post-Nicene Fathers (NPNF), is a set of books containing translations of early Christian writings into English. It was published between 1886 and 1900.

Unlike the Ante-Nicene Fathers which was produced by using earlier translations of the Ante-Nicene Christian Library (ANCL), the Nicene and Post-Nicene Fathers was printed simultaneously in Europe and in America, by T. & T. Clark, by Christian Literature Company and other American editors. The translations were in the main revised versions of those made for the Oxford Movement Library of the Fathers series.  T. & T. Clark was surely convinced by the commercial success of the cheaper American version/revision of the ANCL, although of lesser quality on some minor points. The Swiss-born, German-educated Philip Schaff was commissioned to supervise the first series of the NPNF.  He was joined by the British Henry Wace for the second series.

The volumes include the following:

Augustine volumes 
 Volume I.  Prolegomena: St. Augustine's Life and Work, Confessions, Letters
 Volume II.  The City of God, Christian Doctrine
 Volume III.  On the Holy Trinity, Doctrinal Treatises, Moral Treatises
On the Trinity. The Enchiridion. On the Catechising of the Uninstructed. A Treatise on Faith and the Creed. Concerning Faith of Things Not Seen. On the Profit of Believing. On the Creed: a Sermon to the Catechumens. On Continence. On the Good of Marriage. Of Holy Virginity. On the Good of Widowhood. On Lying. Against Lying. Of the Work of Monks. On Patience. On Care to Be Had for the Dead.
 Volume IV.   The Anti-Manichaean Writings, The Anti-Donatist Writings
Of the Morals of the Catholic Church. On the Morals of the Manichaeans. Concerning Two Souls, Against the Manichaeans. Acts or Disputation Against Fortunatus, the Manichaean. Against the Epistle of Manichaeus Called Fundamental. Reply to Faustus the Manichaean (33 booㅡks). Concerning the Nature of Good, Against the Manichaeans. On Baptism, Against the Donatists (7 books). In Answer to the Letters of Petilian, the Donatist, Bishop of Cirta (3 books). A Treatise Concerning the Correction of the Donatists.
 Volume V.   Anti-Pelagian Writings
On the Merits and Forgiveness of Sins, and on the Baptism of Infants (3 books). On the Spirit and the Letter. On Nature and Grace, Against Pelagius. Concerning Man's Perfection in Righteousness. On the Proceedings of Pelagius. A Treatise on the Grace of Christ, and on Original Sin. On Marriage and Concupiscence (2 books). On the Soul and Its Origin (4 books). A Treatise Against Two Letters of the Pelagians (4 books). A Treatise on Grace and Free Will. Treatise on Rebuke and Grace. A Treatise on the Predestination of the Saints. A Treatise on the Gift of Perseverance, Being the Second Book of the Predestination of the Saints.
 Volume VI.   Sermon on the Mount, Harmony of the Gospels, Homilies on the Gospels
Our Lord's Sermon on the Mount. The Harmony of the Gospels. 97 Sermons on Selected Lessons of the New Testament.
 Volume VII.   Homilies on the Gospel of John, Homilies on the First Epistle of John, Soliloquies
Tractates on John (124 tractates). Ten Homilies on the First Epistle of John. Two Books of Soliloquies.
 Volume VIII.   Expositions on the Psalms

Chrysostom volumes 

 Volume IX.   On the Priesthood, ascetic Treatises, Select Homilies and Letters, Homilies on the Statues
Treatise on the Priesthood. An Exhortation to Theodore After His Fall. Letter I. Letter II. Letter to a Young Widow. Homilies on S. Ignatius and S. Babylas. Eulogy. On the Holy Martyr, S. Babylas. Concerning Lowliness of Mind. Instructions to Catechumens. Three Homilies Concerning the Power of Demons. Against Marcionists and Manichaeans. Homily on the Paralytic Let Down Through the Roof. To Those Who Had Not Attended the Assembly. Homily Against Publishing the Errors of the Brethren. On Eutropius, Patrician and Consul. Two Homilies on Eutropius. A Treatise to Prove that No One Can Harm the Man Who Does Not Injure Himself. Letters to Olympias. To Castus, Valerius, Diophantus, Cyriacus. Correspondence of St. Chrysostom, and the Church at Constantinople, with Innocent, Bishop of Rome. Homilies Concerning the Statues.
 Volume X.   Homilies on the Gospel of St. Matthew
 Volume XI.   Homilies on the Acts of the Apostles and the Epistle to the Romans
 Volume XII.   Homilies on First and Second Corinthians
 Volume XIII.   Homilies on the Epistles to the Galatians, Ephesians, Philippians, Colossians, Thessalonians, Timothy, Titus, and Philemon
 Volume XIV.   Homilies on the Gospel of St. John and the Epistle to the Hebrews

Nicene and Post-Nicene Fathers, Series II 

 Volume I.   Eusebius: Church History from A.D. 1–324, Life of Constantine the Great, Oration in Praise of Constantine
 Volume II.   Socrates: Church History from A.D. 305–438; Sozomenus: Church History from A.D. 323-425
 Volume III.   Theodoret, Jerome, Gennadius, Rufinus: Historical Writings, etc. (1892)
 Volume IV.   Athanasius: Select Writings and Letters
 Volume V.   Gregory of Nyssa: Dogmatic Treatises; Select Writings and Letters
 Volume VI.   Jerome: Letters and Select Works
Letters. The Life of Paulus the First Hermit. The Life of S. Hilarion. The Life of Malchus, the Captive Monk. The Dialogue Against the Luciferians. The Perpetual Virginity of Blessed Mary. Against Jovinianus. Against Vigilantius. To Pammachius Against John of Jerusalem. Against the Pelagians. Prefaces. Translations from the Septuagint and Chaldee. The Commentaries.
 Volume VII.   Cyril of Jerusalem, Gregory Nazianzen
 Volume VIII.   Basil: Letters and Select Works
 Volume IX.   Hilary of Poitiers, John of Damascus
 Volume X.   Ambrose: Select Works and Letters
On the Duties of the Clergy. On the Holy Spirit. On the Decease of His Brother Saytrus. Exposition of the Christian Faith. On the Mysteries. Concerning Repentance. Concerning Virgins. Concerning Widows. Selections from the Letters of St. Ambrose. Memorial of Symmachus, Prefect of the city. Sermon Against Auxentius on the Giving Up of the Basilicas.
 Volume XI.   Sulpicius Severus, Vincent of Lerins, John Cassian
 Volume XII.   Leo the Great, Gregory the Great
 Volume XIII.   Gregory the Great II, Ephraim Syrus, Aphrahat
 Volume XIV.   The Seven Ecumenical Councils

See also
Ante-Nicene Fathers
Ancient Christian Writers
Jacques Paul Migne

External links 
The full text of the Nicene and Post-Nicene Fathers is freely available at:
 Christian Classics Ethereal Library:
 Tertullian Project: 
 Internet Sacred Text Archive: 
 Internet Archive: 
 HathiTrust:  or 

1885 non-fiction books
Publications of patristic texts
Translations into English
Book series introduced in 1885
Christian law